Hans Schmidt (23 December 1893 – 31 January 1971) was a German international footballer and manager.

Club career
As a player, he won the German football championship on four occasions, three of which he won with 1. FC Nürnberg.

International career
In 1913, he made his debut for the Germany national team at the age of 19 in a 2–1 defeat against Switzerland. He was capped 16 times for his country.

Managerial career
In 1933 he joined Schalke 04, leading the club to its first ever German football championship victory a year later. He went on to win two further championships with the club in 1935 and 1937. The club also won the 1937 Tschammerpokal, becoming the first German club to do the double.

Honours
As a player:
 German football championship – 1914, 1924, 1925, 1927

As a manager:
 German football championship – 1934, 1935, 1937, 1949
 Tschammerpokal – 1937

References

External links

1893 births
1971 deaths
German footballers
Association football midfielders
Germany international footballers
SpVgg Greuther Fürth players
1. FC Nürnberg players
German football managers
FC Schalke 04 managers
1. FC Nürnberg managers
VfR Mannheim managers
Borussia Dortmund managers
SpVgg Greuther Fürth managers